The Angola lark (Mirafra angolensis) or Angola bushlark is a species of lark in the family Alaudidae found in southern and central Africa.

Taxonomy and systematics

Subspecies 
Three subspecies are recognized: 
 M. a. marungensis - Hall, BP, 1958: Found in south-eastern Democratic Republic of Congo and south-western Tanzania
 M. a. angolensis - Barboza du Bocage, 1880: Found in northern, western and central Angola
 M. a. antonii - Hall, BP, 1958: Found in eastern Angola to southern Democratic Republic of Congo and north-western Zambia

Distribution and habitat
The range of the Angola lark is sizable, and is found in Angola, Democratic Republic of Congo, Tanzania and Zambia. It is estimated to have a global extent of occurrence of about 170,000 square km. Its natural habitats are subtropical or tropical dry, or seasonally wet, lowland grassland.

References

External links

Angola lark
Birds of Southern Africa
Fauna of Angola
Angola lark
Taxonomy articles created by Polbot